was a  after Ten'an and before Gangyō. This period spanned the years from  April 859 through April 878.

Change of era
 February 7, 859 : The new era name was created to mark an event or series of events. The previous era ended and the new one commenced in Ten'an 3, on the 15th day of the 4th month of 859.

Events of the Jōgan era
 859 (Jōgan 1, 1st month): All New Year's festivities were suspended because of the period of national mourning for the death of Emperor Montoku.
 864 (Jōgan 6, 5th month): Mount Fuji erupted during 10 days, and it ejected from its summit an immense quantity of cinders and ash which fell back to earth as far away as the ocean at Edo bay. Many people perished and a great number of homes were destroyed. The volcanic eruption began on the side of Fuji-san closest to Mount Asama, throwing cinders and ash as far away as Kai Province.
 869 (Jōgan 10): Yōzei was born, and he is named Seiwa's heir in the following year.
 July 9, 869 (May 26, Jōgan 11). The 869 earthquake and tsunami devastates a large part of the Sanriku coast near Sendai.
 876 (Jōgan 17, 11th month): In the 18th year of Seiwa-tennōs reign (清和天皇18年), the emperor ceded his throne to his five-year-old son, which means that the young child received the succession (senso). Shortly thereafter, Emperor Yōzei formally acceded to the throne (sokui).

See also
 Historic eruptions of Mount Fuji

Notes

References
 Brown, Delmer M. and Ichirō Ishida, eds. (1979).  Gukanshō: The Future and the Past. Berkeley: University of California Press. ;  OCLC 251325323
 Nussbaum, Louis-Frédéric and Käthe Roth. (2005).  Japan encyclopedia. Cambridge: Harvard University Press. ;  OCLC 58053128
 Titsingh, Isaac. (1834). Nihon Ōdai Ichiran; ou,  Annales des empereurs du Japon.  Paris: Royal Asiatic Society, Oriental Translation Fund of Great Britain and Ireland. OCLC 5850691
 Varley, H. Paul. (1980). A Chronicle of Gods and Sovereigns: Jinnō Shōtōki of Kitabatake Chikafusa. New York: Columbia University Press. ;  OCLC 6042764

External links 
 National Diet Library, "The Japanese Calendar" -- historical overview plus illustrative images from library's collection

Japanese eras
9th century in Japan
859 beginnings
878 endings